This is an alphabetical list of notable cryptozoologists and people associated with the field of cryptozoology, including prominent skeptics and hoaxers.

A
 Michael M. Ames (1933-2006), Canadian anthropologist and co-author of Manlike Monsters on Trial: Early Records and Modern Evidence
 Ferdinand Anders, Austrian historian and cryptozoology skeptic
 Ada Arney, Canadian journalist and Mugwump researcher

B
 Donald Baird, American palaeontologist and Bigfoot skeptic
 Cliff Barackman, host of Finding Bigfoot
 Ernst Bartels, Ahool researcher and author of The One True Batman
 Zachary Barwise (b. 1994), Little child Hominologist and Locky ness monster researcher
 Henry H. Bauer (b. 1931), American chemist, professor, and Loch Ness Monster researcher
 Dmitri Bayanov, Russian Bigfoot researcher
 Jon-Erik Beckjord (1939-2008), American cryptozoologist and ufologist
 Trevor Beer, British phantom cat researcher
 Ryan Bergara (1990–Present), American cryptozoologist and internet sensation 
 John Bindernagel (1941-2018), Canadian wildlife biologist and Bigfoot researcher; author of North America's Great Ape: the Sasquatch
 Ronald Binns, Loch Ness Monster researcher and author of The Loch Ness Mystery Solved
 Tom Biscardi (b. 1948), Bigfoot researcher involved in multiple hoaxes
 John Blashford-Snell (b. 1936), British explorer and Life President of the Centre for Fortean Zoology
 Joshua Blu Buhs, Bigfoot skeptic and author of Bigfoot: The Life and Times of a Legend
 Neville Bonney, Australian botanist and Tantanoola Tiger researcher
 Janet (b. 1945) and Colin Bord (b. 1931), husband-wife paranormal writers and authors of Alien Animals: A Worldwide Investigation
 Michael Bradley, Bigfoot researcher
 Rudy Breuning, Bigfoot research sponsor
 Nigel Brierly, British phantom cat researcher
 Jean-Louis Brodu, French phantom cat researcher and co-author of Les félins-mystère: sur les traces d'un mythe moderne
 Brian Brown, American digital marketer; creator of the Bigfoot Forums in 2002 and host of several Bigfoot podcasts
 John W. Burns (1888-1962), Canadian teacher and Indian agent; brought the term "Sasquatch" to popular attention in 1929
 Maurice Burton (1898-1992), author of The Elusive Monster: An Analysis of the Evidence from Loch Ness and Loch Ness Monster skeptic
 R. G. Burton, Brigadier General in the British Army and author of several texts on unidentified dogs, wolves, and other canines
 Igor Burtsev, Russian Bigfoot researcher and co-author of Bigfoot Explorers and Introduction to Hominology
 Maya Bykova (d. 1995 or 1996), Russian Bigfoot researcher
 Peter Byrne, Yeti researcher responsible for stealing a finger from the Pangboche Hand

C
 Véronique Campion-Vincent, French phantom cat and urban legend researcher; author of Des fauves dans nos campagnes
 Stueart Campbell, Loch Ness Monster skeptic and author of The Loch Ness Monster: The Evidence
 Robert Todd Carroll (1945-2016), author of The Skeptic's Dictionary and Bigfoot skeptic
 Janice Carter, Bigfoot researcher
 Tim E. Cassidy, American naturalist and cryptozoologist
 Jeffrey Cassar, Maltese cryptozoologist
 Bruce Champagne, marine biologist and cryptozoologist
 Jimmy Chilcutt, American crime scene investigator and Bigfoot researcher
 David Hatcher Childress (b. 1957), American pseudoarchaeologist and cryptozoologist
 Mark Chorvinsky (1954-2005), paranormal skeptic and creator of Strange Magazine
 Jerome Clark (b. 1946), American ufologist and author of over a dozen books on paranormal phenomena including Cryptozoology A to Z
 John Colarusso, Canadian linguist and author of Ethnographic Information on a Wild Man of the Caucasus
 Loren Coleman (b. 1947), author of several books on cryptozoology and notable cryptozoologists
 John Robert Colombo (b. 1936), Canadian writer and author of Mysteries of Ontario
 John Conway, Australian palaeoartist and co-author of Cryptozoologicon
 William R. Corliss (1926-2011), anomalist and author of many books pertaining to unexplained phenomena in the natural world
 Paul Cropper, Australian cryptozoologist and author of Out of the Shadows: Mystery Animals of Australia
 Matt Crowley, Bigfoot researcher

D
 David J. Daegling, American anthropologist who has performed research on Bigfoot video evidence
 René Dahinden (1930-2001), Swiss-Canadian Bigfoot researcher
 Zhugdariyn Damdin, Mongolian Almas researcher
 Nikolai Damilin, Russian cryptozoologist
 Ann Richardson Davis, American cryptozoologist and author of The Tale of the Altamaha "Monster"
 Vine Deloria Jr. (1933-2005), Dakota activist and proponent of fossil giants
 Matthew Delph, Bigfoot researcher
 G. P. Dement'ev, Russians Almas researcher and co-author of Une note sur l'homme des neiges en Mongolie
 Fritz Dieterlen, German mammalogist and Andean wolf researcher
 Tim Dinsdale (1924-1987), Loch Ness Monster researcher
 Jonathan Downes (b. 1959), British cryptozoologist and founder of the Centre for Fortean Zoology
 Rick Dyer, American businessman and Bigfoot hoaxer
 John H. Duffy (b. 1968), American science educator, environmental scientist, and cryptozoology skeptic.
Frank Durante (b.1986),
Pennsylvania police officer, independent researcher and Bigfoot witness. 
Dally Sandradiputra, Indonesian Author and Cryptozoologist, Researcher of Orang Pendek and Orang Gadang in Sumatera

E
 George M. Eberhart, American cryptozoologist and author of Mysterious Creatures: A Guide to Cryptozoology
 Eduardo Viveiros de Castro (born 1951) is a Brazilian anthropologist 
 Richard Ellis (b. 1938), marine life artist and author of Monsters of the Sea and The Search for the Giant Squid
 Charlie Estepp, American Bigfoot researcher

F
 Wolf Henner Fahrenbach, American invertebrate zoologist and Bigfoot researcher
 Tim Fasano (1956-2019), American taxi driver, blogger, and Bigfoot researcher
 James "Bobo" Fay, host of Finding Bigfoot
 Randy Filipovic, Canadian Bigfoot researcher
 LeRoy Fish, American wildlife biologist and Bigfoot researcher
 Harlan Ford (d. 1980), wildlife photographer and Honey Island Swamp monster researcher
 Di Francis, British phantom cat researcher
 Paul Freeman (1943-2003), Bigfoot researcher
 Richard Freeman (b. 1970), British cryptozoologist and Centre for Fortean Zoology researcher
 John Freitas (b. 1956), Bigfoot researcher

G
 Andrew D. Gable, American writer and cryptozoologist
 Claude Gagnon (b. 1944), philosophy professor specializing in history of science; co-author of Lake Monster Traditions: A Cross-Cultural Analysis
 Gary J. Galbreath, sea serpent skeptic
 Clive Gamble (b. 1951), British anthropologist; wild men skeptic and co-author of In Search of the Neanderthals
 Bob Garrett, American Bigfoot researcher and conspiracy theorist
 Josh Gates (b. 1977), host of paranormal and cryptozoology-focused television shows including Destination Truth
 Albert Samuel Gatschet (1832-1907), Swiss-American anthropologist and lake monster researcher
 D. G. Gerahty, prolific author of fictional novels based on allegedly-true encounters with the Loch Ness Monster
 Ken Gerhard (b. 1967), Centre for Fortean Zoology researcher and author of several books including Big Bird!: Modern Sightings of Flying Monsters
 Wes Germer, American podcaster and co-host of Sasquatch Chronicles
 Rex and Heather Gilroy, Australian husband-wife cryptozoology team
 Bob Gimlin (b. 1931), American horse trainer who controversially claims to have filmed a living Bigfoot in 1967
 Frank Gordon, Australian herpetologist and giant monitor lizard proponent
 Rupert Gould (1890-1948), Loch Ness Monster researcher
 John Willison Green (1927-2016), Canadian journalist and Bigfoot researcher
 J. Richard Greenwell (1942-2005), secretary of the International Society of Cryptozoology

H-I
 Doug Hajicek, American filmmaker and producer of several cryptozoology documentaries including Sasquatch: Legend Meets Science
 Mark A. Hall (1946-2016), American cryptozoologist and former Director of the Society for the Investigation of the Unexplained (SITU)
 Marjorie H. Halpin, editor and co-author of Manlike Monsters on Trial: Early Records and Modern Evidence
 Gathorne Gathorne-Hardy, 1st Earl of Cranbrook (1814-1906), British politician and Beruang Rambai researcher
 Tony Healy (b. 1945), Australian cryptozoologist and co-author of Out of the Shadows: Mystery Animals of Australia
 Michael Heaney, folklorist and Almas researcher
 Craig Heinselman, American cryptozoologist
 Scott Herriot, Bigfoot Field Researchers Organization investigator
 Bernard Heuvelmans (1916-2001), Belgian-French cryptozoologist and author of several books on the topic including On the Track of Unknown Animals
 William Hichens (d. 1944), British colonial administrator and author of African Mystery Beasts
 Jim Hiers, American member of the Bigfoot Rangers research team
 Alton Higgins, Bigfoot Field Researchers Organization physical evidence coordinator
 Howard Hill, British ufologist and proponent of prehistoric giants
Dan Houser, Host of Bigfoot Backpacker Podcast
 William Charles Osman Hill (1901-1975), British primatologist and cryptozoologist
 Peter Hocking, Peruvian ornithologist; Peruvian tiger and anomalous jaguar researcher
 Al Hodgson, curator of Willow Creek-China Flat Museum aka the "Bigfoot Museum" in Willow Creek, California
 Fredrick William Holiday (1921-1979), English journalist and Loch Ness Monster researcher
 Ranae Holland, host of Finding Bigfoot
 Trader Horn (1861-1931), English ivory trader and explorer; proponent of the Amali
 Don Hunter, British-Canadian journalist and author of Sasquatch/Bigfoot: The Search for North America's Incredible Creature
 Patrick Huyghe, lake monster researcher and co-author of The Field Guide to Lake Monsters, Sea Serpents, and Other Mystery Denizens of the Deep
 Ivan Ivlov, Russian pediatrician and Almas researcher

J-K
 William Jevning, Bigfoot researcher and co-host of Sasquatch Chronicles
 John Keel (1930-2009), American ufologist and Mothman researcher; author of The Mothman Prophecies
 Kevin Kehl, American Bigfoot researcher
 Melba Ketchum, Bigfoot researcher
 Christine M. Kirkland, American Folklorist, Cryptozoologist
 John Kirk, lake monster researcher and President of the British Columbia Scientific Cryptoozology Club; author of In the Domain of the Lake Monsters
 Marie-Jeanne Koffmann, Russian Bigfoot researcher
 Aleksandr Kondratov (1937-1993), Russian scientist and proponent of living dinosaurs; author of Динозавра ищите в глубинах (English: Dinosaurs in the Depths)
 C. M. Kosemen (b. 1984), Turkish artist and co-author of Cryptozoologicon
 Andrei Kozlov, Almatsi researcher
 Grover Krantz (1931-2002), American physical anthropologist and Bigfoot researcher
 Ingo Krumbiegel, German mammalogist who scientifically described the Andean wolf (Dasycyon hagenbecki) in 1949

L
 Richard S. Lambert (1894-1981), English-Canadian writer; author of Exploring the Supernatural: The Weird in Canadian Folklore
 Rebecca Lang, phantom cat researcher and co-author of Australian Big Cats: An Unnatural History of Panthers
 Rula Lenska (b. 1947), Polish-English actor and conservation activist; co-author of Mammoth Hunt: In Search of the Giant Elephants of Nepal
 Willy Ley (1906-1969), German-American science writer and author of several texts on cryptozoology, including Exotic Zoology
 Daniel Loxton (b. 1975), Canadian writer and cryptozoology skeptic; co-author of Abominable Science!: Origins of the Yeti, Nessie, and Other Famous Cryptids

M
 Roy Mackal (1925-2013), University of Chicago professor known for interest in Loch Ness Monster and Mokele mbembe
 John MacKinnon, British zoologist and Batûtût researcher; author of In Search of the Red Ape
 Ulrich Magin (b. 1962), German journalist and cryptozoologist
 Vladimir Markotic (1920-1994), Croatian-American anthropologist and cryptozoologist
 Scott Marlowe, Skunk Ape researcher and founder of the Pangea Institute
 Jennifer Marshall, American private investigator and co-host of Mysteries Decoded - Bigfoot
 Adrienne Mayor (b. 1946), author of Fossil Legends of the First Americans and cryptozoology skeptic
 Jim McClarin, American Bigfoot researcher
 Robin McCray, Bigfoot researcher and co-author of Bigfoot Explorers and Introduction to Hominology
 Jeffrey Meldrum (b. 1958), Idaho State University anatomy and anthropology professor; Bigfoot researcher
 Tim Mendham, executive officer of Australian Skeptics and Bigfoot skeptic
 Reinhold Messner (b. 1944), Italian mountaineer; Yeti skeptic and author of My Quest for the Yeti
 , French essayist specializing in sci-fi literature; co-authored Lake Monster Traditions and phantom cat-related Les félins-mystère.
 Marc Wolfgang Miller, American explorer and cryptozoologist
 Chris Moiser, British phantom cat researcher
 Matthew Moneymaker, founder of the Bigfoot Field Researchers Organization and host of Finding Bigfoot
 Chester Moore, American Bigfoot researcher and founder of American Prime Conservation Alliance
 Karen Mutton, Australian archaeologist and hominid cryptozoologist
 Muaed Mysyrjan, Kabardian teacher and Almatsi researcher

N
 Darren Naish (b. 1975), British palaeontologist and cryptid skeptic; author of Hunting Monsters: Cryptozoology and the Reality Behind the Myths and Cryptozoologicon
 John R. Napier (1917-1987), primatologist and Bigfoot researcher
 Henry Newman, British journalist in India who popularized the phrase "Abominable Snowman" while investigating reports of large footprints in the Himalayas
 Joe Nickell (b. 1944), American paranormal skeptic and co-author of Lake Monster Mysteries: Investigating the World's Most Elusive Creatures
 Richard Noll, American Bigfoot researcher
 Rory Nugent (b. 1952), American explorer and Mokele-mbembe researcher

O
 David O'Reilly, phantom cat researcher and author of Savage Shadow: the Search for the Australian Cougar
 Anthonie Cornelis Oudemans (1858-1943), Dutch zoologist and sea serpent researcher
 Bruce L. Owens, phantom cat researcher

P-Q
 Sylvain Pallix, French filmmaker and Almatsi researcher
 Roger Patterson (1933-1972), Bigfoot researcher who controversially claimed to have filmed Bigfoot in 1967
 Wenzcislaw Plawinskiy, Polish Almas researcher
 Boris Porshnev (1905-1972), Soviet historian and cryptozoologist
 Tony Pratt  (b. 1957), American Bigfoot researcher and Television Producer/Host of Mystery Us and Weird News Network; author of "Mystery Us Universe"
 Woody Pratt, American podcaster and co-host of Sasquatch Chronicles
 Donald Prothero (b. 1954), American palaeontologist and cryptozoology skeptic; co-author of Abominable Science!: Origins of the Yeti, Nessie, and Other Famous Cryptids
 Robert Michael Pyle (b. 1947), American lepidopterist and Bigfoot researcher; author of Where Bigfoot Walks: Crossing the Dark Divide
 Mike Quast, American Bigfoot researcher

R
 Benjamin Radford (b. 1970), American writer and cryptozoology skeptic; author of Bigfoot at 50: Evaluating the Evidence
 Derek Randles, Bigfoot researcher
 Dick Raynor, Loch Ness Monster researcher
 Ward Reed, American contractor and Bigfoot researcher
 Brian Regal, American science historian and cryptozoology skeptic; author of Searching for Sasquatch: Crackpots, Eggheads and Cryptozoology
 Alexander Rempel, Russian anomalist and Bigfoot researcher
 Bob Rickard, British writer and former editor of the Fortean Times
 Byambyn Rinchen (1905-1977), Mongolian scholar and proponent of Almas research
 Robert H. Rines (1922-2009), Loch Ness Monster researcher
 Kai Roath, American documentary filmmaker and Yeti researcher
 James F. Robinson, Canadian ufologist and lake monster researcher
 John E. Roth, little people researcher and author of American Elves: An Encyclopedia Of Little People From The Lore Of 380 Ethnic Groups Of The Western Hemisphere
 Marc Rowley, Bigfoot research sponsor
 Jarret Ruminski, American writer and Bigfoot skeptic
 W.M. Gerald Russell, American naturalist and cryptozoologist

S
 Ivan T. Sanderson (1911-1973), paranormal writer and cryptozoologist
 Andrew Sanford, American cryptozoologist and co-host of Mysteries Decoded - Bigfoot
 Valentin B. Sapunov, Russian biologist and Bigfoot researcher
 Esteban Sarmiento, primatologist and Bigfoot skeptic
 Ed Schillinger, American surveyor and Bigfoot researcher
 Robert "JavaBob" Schmalzbach, American Bigfoot researcher
 Marcus Scibanicus, Polish cryptozoologist
 Peter Scott (1909-1989), co-founder of the Loch Ness Phenomena Investigation Bureau
 Daniel O. Schmitt, American anthropologist who has performed research on Bigfoot video evidence
 Eduard Seler (1849-1922), German anthropologist and cryptozoology skeptic
 Myra Shackley (b. 1949), British archaeologist and Bigfoot skeptic; author of Wildmen: Yeti, Sasquatch, and the Neanderthal Enigma
 Don Sherman, American Bigfoot researcher
 Tony "Doc" Shiels (b. 1938), British magician and cryptozoologist
 Karl Shuker (b. 1959), British cryptozoologist and author
 Paul Sieveking (b. 1949), British writer and former editor of the Fortean Times
 Alexei Sitnikov, Russian cryptozoologist known for research into Siberian cryptids
 B. Ann Slate, American paranormal investigator and cryptozoologist
 Tom Slick (1916-1962), American adventurer and cryptozoologist
 Malcolm Smith (b. 1949), Australian cryptozoologist and author of Bunyips and Bigfoots: In Search of Australia's Mystery Animals
 Roderick Sprague (1933-2012), American anthropologist and Bigfoot researcher; author of The Scientist Looks at Sasquatch
 John Stamey, Bigfoot researcher and co-author of Bigfoot Explorers and Introduction to Hominology
 Todd Standing, Canadian documentarian and Bigfoot tracker
 Tom Steenburg, Canadian writer and Bigfoot researcher
 Kathy Moskowitz Strain, anthropologist and Bigfoot researcher
 Chris Stringer (b. 1947), British anthropologist; wild men skeptic and co-author of In Search of the Neanderthals
 Mary Sutherland, ufologist and giant researcher
 Daris Swindler (1925-2007), American anthropologist and Bigfoot skeptic

T
 Dallas Tanner, American cryptozoologist and author of several fiction novels on the topic
 I.F. Tatzl, Russian Bigfoot researcher
 Odette Tchernine (1897-1992), British author and cryptozoologist
 James Terry (1844-1912), American anthropologist and Bigfoot researcher; author of Sculptured Anthropoid Ape Heads Found in or near the Valley of the John Day River
 Lars Thomas, British phantom cat researcher
 Bob Titmus, first Bigfoot researcher to analyze the site of the Patterson–Gimlin film
 Michael Trachtengerts (1937-2017), Russian anthropologist
 Édouard Louis Trouessart (1842-1927), French zoologist and early proponent of a cryptid in Lake Chad
 Marcello Truzzi (1935-2003), skeptic and founder of several research groups including the Committee for the Scientific Investigation of Claims of the Paranormal (CSICOP)
 Jamsrangiin Tseveen (1880-1942), Buryat scientist and Almas researcher
 Denys Tucker, former chief scientist of the British Museum and Loch Ness Monster researcher
 Frank Turk (1911-1996), British phantom cat researcher
 Sergei Turkin, Russian Bigfoot researcher

W
 M. A. Wetherell (1883-1939), leader of a 1933 expedition to find the Loch Ness Monster and hoaxer behind the "surgeon's photograph"
 Jonathan Whitcomb, Ropen researcher and proponent of modern pterosaurs. He is a young earth Creationist
 Constance Whyte, co-founder of the Loch Ness Phenomena Investigation Bureau
 Ezekiel Stone Wiggins (1839-1910), Canadian psychic and cryptozoologist
 Michael Williams, phantom cat researcher and co-author of Australian Big Cats: An Unnatural History of Panthers
 Paul Willis, Australian science communicator and Yowie skeptic
 Nicholas Witchell (b. 1953), English journalist and Loch Ness Monster researcher

Y-Z
 Mikhail Sergeyevich Yeltsin, Russian Bigfoot researcher
 Leonid Yershov, Russian cryptozoologist
 Eugene Yost, Bigfoot researcher
 Greg "Squatchman" Yost, Bigfoot researcher
 D. Zevegmid, Russian Almas researcher and co-author of Une note sur l'homme des neiges en Mongolie

See also
List of cryptids

References

 
Crypto